The Radboud University Medical Center (Dutch: Radboudumc), is the teaching hospital affiliated with the Radboud University Nijmegen, in the city of Nijmegen in the eastern-central part of the Netherlands.

The Radboud University Medical Center was founded in 1956. It changed its name to UMC St Radboud and transformed to a complete new organization in 1999 by a merger of the Academisch Ziekenhuis Nijmegen (AZN) (Academic Hospital of Nijmegen) and the medical faculty of the Katholieke Universiteit Nijmegen (Catholic University of Nijmegen), now the Radboud University Nijmegen. Thus, it is a semi-independent medical university and hospital, which is not directly linked to the Radboud University. In 2013 the hospital changed its name to Radboudumc in Dutch and Radboud University Medical Center in English. 
 
It is one of the largest and leading hospitals of The Netherlands, providing supraregional tertiary care for residents of a large part of the eastern section of The Netherlands.

The medical center has about 1,000 beds, employs about 10,000 employees, and offers educational services to about 3,000 students in the following academic courses:
 Medicine
 Biomedical Sciences
 Dentistry
 Molecular Mechanisms of Disease
 Cognitive Neurosciences

Research
The medical center's infrastructure consists of several technology centers and three research institutes:
 Radboud Institute for Molecular Life Sciences
 Radboud Institute for Health Sciences 
 The Donders Center for Medical Neuroscience within the Donders Center for Brain, Cognition and Behaviour and several technology centers

The scientists perform cross-disciplinary research regarding 18 clinically relevant research themes.

External links

 

Hospital buildings completed in 1956
Teaching hospitals in the Netherlands
Hospitals established in 1999
Academic health science centres
1999 establishments in the Netherlands
Organisations based in Gelderland
Buildings and structures in Nijmegen
Radboud University Nijmegen